The St Barths Bucket Regatta is an annual boat race, held over three days in Saint Barthélemy, in the Caribbean. It is usually held in the month of March. The first regatta in St Barths itself was held in 1995 with four yachts; Sariyah, Gleam, Mandalay and Parlay. Ten years later, 26 boats competed in the race. To apply to race, yachtsmen must receive an invitation and enters boats 100 feet and up. In the 2008 regatta, boats including the 125 ft Altair, the 115-ft Tenacious, the 148-ft Helios and the 152-ft Windrose (the winner).

References

External links
Official site

Saint Barthélemy culture
Boat races
1995 establishments in Saint Barthélemy
Recurring events established in 1995
Annual events in Saint Barthélemy